Mer Rouge is a village in Morehouse Parish, Louisiana, United States. The name is French for "Red Sea". The population was 628 at the 2010 census. It is part of the Bastrop Micropolitan Statistical Area.

History 
There is a hill that serves as a boundary between Mer Rouge and Bastrop, named Red Hill. The name "Mer Rouge" came from its founder, Davenport, after the red wavy soil of the hill. Another version of how Mer Rouge derived its name is that settlers looking across the prairie of red clover from atop of Red Hill called it a red sea.

On February 3, 1865, near the end of the American Civil War, two squadrons of the Illinois [cavalry attacked Mer Rouge and, according to the historian John D. Winters seized some horses, mules, while also freeing some enslaved African-Americans. They then "burned about 300,000 bushels of corn [and] some cotton" thus undermining the production power of the pro-slavery rebels.

In August 1922, in a case that would attract national attention, members of the Ku Klux Klan abducted two white men—Filmore Watt Daniel and Thomas Fletcher Richard—in Mer Rouge. After torturing and killing the men, the Klansmen disposed of their bodies in nearby Lake Lafourche. Following the killings, Louisiana Governor John M. Parker sought help from the U.S. Department of Justice in suppressing Klan violence within the state.

Demographics

As of the census of 2000, there were 956 people, 504 households, and 172 families residing in the village. The racial makeup of the village was 62.97% White, 36.48% African American, 0.28% Native American, and 0.28% from two or more races. Hispanic or Latino of any race were 1.11% of the population.

There were 264 households, out of which 27.7% had children under the age of 18 living with them, 41.7% were married couples living together, 20.1% had a female householder with no husband present, and 34.5% were non-families. 30.7% of all households were made up of individuals, and 15.2% had someone living alone who was 65 years of age or older. The average household size was 2.28 and the average family size was 2.86.

In the village, the population was spread out, with 20.0% under the age of 18, 7.4% from 18 to 24, 23.3% from 25 to 44, 20.9% from 45 to 64, and 28.4% who were 65 years of age or older. The median age was 45 years. For every 100 females, there were 81.2 males. For every 100 females age 18 and over, there were 78.1 males.

The median income for a household in the village was $23,472, and the median income for a family was $27,273. Males had a median income of $26,833 versus $19,861 for females. The per capita income for the village was $12,759. About 29.7% of families and 39.6% of the population were below the poverty line, including 51.7% of those under age 18 and 10.9% of those age 65 or over.

Notable people

 Lou Brock, former Major League Baseball player and member of the Baseball Hall of Fame
 Ben Lilly, a famous big game hunter, once owned a farm located near Mer Rouge. 
 Newt V. Mills, U.S. Representative from Louisiana's 5th congressional district, taught school in Mer Rouge from 1921 to 1932.
 Samuel W. Mitcham Jr., American writer of military history, was born in Mer Rouge.

References

External links
 
 Mer Rouge Progress Community Progress Site for Mer Rouge, LA

Villages in Morehouse Parish, Louisiana
Villages in Louisiana